Kildrumsherdan, also recorded as Killersherdiny, is a civil parish in the historical barony of Tullygarvey in  County Cavan, Ireland.

References

Civil parishes of County Cavan